Belghoria Expressway is a four-lane  (including Dakshineswar to Rajchandrapur extension) long grade separated tolled expressway in the North Suburban fringes of Kolkata, West Bengal. It is a key arterial road, linking the terminal junction points of NH 16 and NH 19 at Rajchandrapur (near Dankuni) to Dakshineswar across Nivedita Setu and then to NH 12 (Jessore Road) at Dumdum/Kolkata Airport.

Gallery

References

Roads in Kolkata
Expressways in West Bengal